Yury Sergeyevich Tyukalov (4 July 1930 – 19 February 2018) was a Russian rower. He started primarily as a single sculler; he also won an Olympic gold medal in 1952 and a silver medal at the 1955 European Championships. His Olympic medal was the first Soviet gold medal in rowing. Later in 1955, facing strong competition against the rising star Vyacheslav Ivanov, he teamed with Aleksandr Berkutov. Together they won five consecutive European titles between 1956–61; the Henley Royal Regatta in 1957 and 1958; the Soviet title in 1957 and 1961; an Olympic gold medal in 1956; and an Olympic silver in 1960.

Tyukalov was a native of Saint Petersburg (Leningrad) and spent his entire life in the city. He survived the Siege of Leningrad (1941–44), and during that time helped extinguish fires brought by German air raids. He was awarded the Medal "For the Defence of Leningrad", and was named an honored citizen of Saint Petersburg. 

Tyukalov took up rowing in June 1945 and won multiple national rowing titles between 1948 and 1962. After retiring from competitions, he worked as a coach and headed the Soviet rowing team between 1968 and 1972. Starting from 2012 he organized the "Regatta of Yuriy Tyukalov", which was also carried out every year after his death. Besides rowing Tyukalov was a renowned sculptor in metal. He graduated with honors from the Leningrad Higher School of Art and Industry and later designed a coat of arms for Saint Petersburg.

References

External links
  Biography

1930 births
2018 deaths
Russian male rowers
Rowers at the 1952 Summer Olympics
Rowers at the 1956 Summer Olympics
Rowers at the 1960 Summer Olympics
Olympic rowers of the Soviet Union
Medalists at the 1952 Summer Olympics
Medalists at the 1956 Summer Olympics
Medalists at the 1960 Summer Olympics
Olympic medalists in rowing
Olympic gold medalists for the Soviet Union
Olympic silver medalists for the Soviet Union
Rowers from Saint Petersburg
World Rowing Championships medalists for the Soviet Union
Burials at Nikolskoe Cemetery
European Rowing Championships medalists